Patania is a genus of moths of the family Crambidae described by Frederic Moore in 1888.

Species

 Patania aedilis (Meyrick, 1887)
 Patania aegrotalis (Zeller, 1852)
 Patania agilis (Meyrick, 1936)
 Patania balteata (Fabricius, 1798)
 Patania batrachina (Meyrick, 1936)
 Patania brevipennis (Inoue, 1982)
 Patania characteristica (Warren, 1896)
 Patania chlorophanta (Butler, 1878)
 Patania concatenalis (Walker, 1866)
 Patania costalis (Moore, 1888)
 Patania crocealis (Duponchel, 1834)
 Patania deficiens (Moore, 1887)
 Patania emmetris (Turner, 1915)
 Patania expictalis (Christoph, 1881)
 Patania ferrugalis (Fabricius, 1781)
 Patania harutai (Inoue, 1955)
 Patania haryoalis (Strand, 1918)
 Patania hemipolialis (Hampson, 1918)
 Patania holophaealis (Hampson, 1912)
 Patania imbecilis (Moore, 1888)
 Patania inferior (Hampson, 1899)
 Patania iopasalis (Walker, 1859)
 Patania jatingaensis Rose & Singh, 1989
 Patania menoni Kirti & Gill, 2007
 Patania mundalis (South in Leech & South, 1901)
 Patania mysisalis (Walker, 1859)
 Patania paleacalis (Guenée, 1854)
 Patania palliventralis (Snellen, 1890)
 Patania pauperalis (Marion, 1954)
 Patania punctimarginalis (Hampson, 1896)
 Patania quadrimaculalis (Kollar & Redtenbacher, 1844)
 Patania ruralis (Scopoli, 1763)
 Patania sabinusalis (Walker, 1859)
 Patania scinisalis (Walker, 1859)
 Patania silicalis (Guenée, 1854)
 Patania suisharyella (Strand, 1918)
 Patania symphonodes (Turner, 1913)
 Patania tardalis (Snellen, 1880)
 Patania tchadalis (P. Leraut, 2005)
 Patania tenuis (Warren, 1896)
 Patania ultimalis (Walker, 1859)
 Patania verecunda (Warren, 1896)
 Patania violacealis (Guillermet, 1996)

Former species
 Patania accipitralis (Walker, 1866)
 Patania caletoralis (Walker, 1859)
 Patania fraterna (Moore, 1885)
 Patania orobenalis (Snellen, 1880)
 Patania plagiatalis (Walker, 1859)

References

Spilomelinae
Crambidae genera
Taxa named by Frederic Moore